The Eye 2 is a 2004 Hong Kong supernatural horror film directed and edited by Danny and Oxide Pang. It is a standalone sequel to The Eye (2002). Produced by Mediacorp Raintree Pictures and Applause, the film was released in Hong Kong on 8 March 2004.

Plot
Believing she is being rejected by her boyfriend Sam, Joey attempts suicide with sleeping pills, but recovers after having her stomach pumped. When she looks forward to a brand new life, she discovers that she is pregnant. Being tortured by the thought of an abortion and unable to contact Sam, Joey finds herself becoming delusional and emotionally unstable.

Joey begins to see the spirits of dead people, and also feels she is being stalked by a mysterious ghost woman. She believes the ghost wants to hurt her unborn baby. As the story unfolds, it is discovered that the ghost is Sam's wife who committed suicide by jumping in front of an oncoming train. She is now awaiting Joey's baby's birth so that she may be reincarnated within her.

After discovering this, Joey would rather kill herself and her baby than let this woman become her child. While in a hospital, awaiting the birth of her child, Joey jumps off the building twice, but survives both times. She gives birth in the end, realizing the terms with her situation.

Her psychiatrist's explanation is that Joey feels guilty about Sam's wife's suicide. Finally she accepts this responsibility, no longer recognizing Sam and disillusioned about her baby's father.

As Joey checks out of the hospital, the camera pans across a room of expecting mothers, each with a ghost hovering by their sides.

Cast
 Shu Qi as Joey Cheng
 Eugenia Yuan as Yuen Chi-kei
 Jesdaporn Pholdee as Sam
 Philip Kwok as Monk
 Rayson Tan as Gynaecologist

Release
The film was released in theatres in Hong Kong and Thailand on 18 March 2004, and in Singapore on 25 March, earning $740,514 on its opening weekend, setting a new record for a horror film in Singapore. In the Philippines, the film was released on 19 May.

Home media
The film was released on VCD in May 2004.

Reception
Ong Sor Fern of The Straits Times gave the movie three and a half stars out of five: "While this does not exactly hit the bull's eye dead centre, at least it is not an unfocused mess". Wendy Teo of The New Paper gave the film three stars out of five, praising the performances of Shu Qi and Yuan, while criticising the plot as only being a slight modification from the formula of the first film.

See also
 List of ghost films

References

External links
 
 

2004 films
2000s Cantonese-language films
2000s pregnancy films
2004 horror films
Hong Kong ghost films
Hong Kong pregnancy films
Hong Kong supernatural horror films
Thai ghost films
Thai supernatural horror films
Thai-language films
2000s Hong Kong films